Alexander Rehding  is Fanny Peabody Professor of Music at Harvard University. Rehding is a music theorist and musicologist with a focus on intellectual history and media theory, known for innovative interdisciplinary work. His publications explore music in a wide range of contexts from Ancient Greek music to the Eurovision Song Contest—and even in outer space. His research has contributed to Riemannian theory, the history of music theory, sound studies, and media archaeology, reaching into the digital humanities and ecomusicology.

Biography
A native of Hamburg, Germany, Rehding was educated at Queens' College, Cambridge University. He held research fellowships at Emmanuel College, Cambridge, the Penn Humanities Forum (now Wolf Humanities Center at the University of Pennsylvania) and the Society of Fellows in the Liberal Arts at Princeton University before joining the Music Department at Harvard University in 2003, initially as Assistant Professor. He was promoted to a full professorship only two years later, the first successful tenure case in the Music Department in over forty years. In 2009 he was named Fanny Peabody Professor of Music. Rehding served as department chair between 2011 and 2014. At Harvard, Rehding is an Affiliate of the Department of Germanic Languages and Literature, the Department of Visual and Environmental Studies and an Associate of the Minda de Gunzburg Center for European Studies and the Center for the Environment.

From 2006 to 2011 Rehding served as co-editor of Acta Musicologica (the journal of the International Musicological Society), and became Editor-in-chief of the Oxford Handbook Online series in Music in 2011.  His has received awards and fellowships from the John Simon Guggenheim Memorial Foundation, American Council of Learned Societies (ACLS)., the Andrew W. Mellon Foundation, and the Alexander von Humboldt Foundation. He was a visiting scholar at the Free University of Berlin and the Max Planck Institute for the History of Science in Berlin, at the Newhouse Center at Wellesley College, and was Rieman and Baketel Fellow at the Radcliffe Institute of Advanced Study. He was the inaugural recipient of the Jerome Roche award of the Royal Musical Association, and received the Dent Medal awarded jointly by the Royal Musical Association and the International Musicological Society in 2014.

Rehding has been active in promoting the field of Sound studies. In 2013 Rehding founded the Sound Lab at Harvard. In 2013/14 he organized the Sawyer Seminars in the Comparative Study of Culture on the topic of “Hearing Modernity.” The website now functions as an archive of the series.  Using the resources of sound lab, Rehding launched a number of innovative courses, including The Art of Listening (as part of Harvard’s short-lived “Frameworks in the Humanities” series). With the help of the Sound Lab, Rehding pursues the integration of multi-media projects into scholarship in the context of ongoing efforts to further open up the humanities to the digital domain.

In 2015-17 Rehding co-chaired a committee (with then department chair Carol Oja) that designed a new curriculum for Harvard’s music concentration. The curricular reform was notable in that it was unanimously approved by the department but stirred much controversy in the wider field.

Scholarship

History of Music Theory
Rehding has worked extensively on the influential nineteenth-century German music theorist Hugo Riemann, contributing to the historical figure as well as Neo-Riemannian theory. Rehding reconstructs the cultural and philosophical contexts in nineteenth-century Germany that allowed Riemann’s problematic ideas to appear compelling and cogent, and explores particularly Riemann’s encounters with non-Western music and the early period of sound reproduction.

The question of encounters of Western music theory with other musical traditions and repertories has guided much of Rehding’s work in the history of music theory—covering a range of topics including ancient Greek music and the Enlightenment interest in Chinese music.
His work on ancient Egyptian music takes as a starting point the paradox that no usable traces of this musical tradition survive, but it formed an essential early chapter in the general sweep of music history. The multiple attempts to reconstruct this repertory (without any facts) reveal much about changing historiographic assumptions.

Rehding’s book Music from Earth (with Daniel Chua) takes this interest in the musical “other” to the largest level: in 1977 NASA sent a collection of world music into outer space, the Voyager Golden Record, in hopes that someone out there might find it some time in the distant future. Their project explores in an extended thought experiment NASA’s assumption that music can be used to communicate with extraterrestrials and imagines what a posthuman music theory might look like.

Media Aesthetics
A second major line of Rehding’s research, extending from Hugo Riemann’s diatribes against the modern technology of phonography in the late nineteenth century, explores the impact of technological media on musical thought.

The wider ramifications of questions of transmission and reconstruction led Rehding to an engagement with musical media, including notation and recording technology. In particular Rehding brings German media theory (Friedrich Kittler, Sybille Krämer, Wolfgang Ernst) to bear on music theory. The mechanical siren—an unlikely musical instrument—has played an important part in shaping Rehding’s thinking about sound media, as has the little-known music theorist Friedrich Wilhelm Opelt.

Much of Rehding’s work foregrounds the role of musical instruments in theorizing. He proposes that we regard them as media—promoting and inhibiting certain kinds of sounding data—that allow theorists to make certain insights. This intersection with Critical Organology, History of Science, and Thing theory is explored in a number of works.
 
His monograph on Beethoven’s Ninth Symphony doubles as an exploration of media theory. It proposes an anti-chronological approach that re-hears this central work of the musical canon through its digital reimagination in Leif Inge’s 9 Beet Stretch (2002).

Rehding has collaborated on the topic of neuroaesthetics with his husband Bevil Conway, a neuroscientist and visual artist.

Nineteenth- and Twentieth-Century Music History
Rehding has published numerous articles on nineteenth- and twentieth-century music, on such composers as Ludwig van Beethoven, Richard Wagner, Franz Liszt, Igor Stravinsky and Arnold Schoenberg. His monograph Music and Monumentality was the first book-length exploration of this concept, exploring the imaginary connection between “big” sounds and ambitions of greatness in the music of nineteenth-century Germany. In a six vignettes, it approaches the “monumental” works of the German symphonic tradition between Beethoven and Bruckner, lodged between the aesthetics of the sublime and a nationally framed memory culture. The book has also been influential on the new field of arrangement studies.

He is series editor (with David Irving) of the multi-volume Cultural History of Music for Bloomsbury.

Ecomusicology
Rehding may have inadvertently coined the term “Ecomusicology” when he used this title for a review article published in 2002. Explorations of the concept of nature have been an important part of his work in the history of music theory. His more recent contributions to this field have focused increasingly on contemporary ecological concerns (apocalyptic thinking, Anthropocene, the "Long Now”). Rehding argues that music, with its flexible temporalities, has an important role to play in fostering thinking about the distant future, corresponding to one major strand of contemporary ecological thought. His contributions on long timespans and extreme slowness fall under the wider field of chronocriticism.

Select Publications

Monographs
 Hugo Riemann and the Birth of Modern Musical Thought (2003)
 Music and Monumentality: Commemoration and Wonderment in Nineteenth-Century Germany (2009)
 Beethoven's Symphony no. 9 (2017)

Edited Volumes
 Music Theory and Natural Order from the Renaissance to the Early Twentieth Century, with Suzannah Clark (2001)
 The Oxford Handbook of Riemannian and Neo-Riemannian Music Theories, with Edward Gollin (2011)
 Music in Time: Phenomenology, Perception, Performance, with Suzannah Clark (2016)
 The Oxford Handbook of Critical Concepts in Music Theory, with Steven Rings (online; print: 2019)
 The Oxford Handbook of Timbre, with Emily Dolan (online; print: 2020)

Articles
 “Towards a ‘Logic of Discontinuity’ in Stravinsky’s Symphonies of Wind Instruments,” Music Analysis 17/1 (1998): 32-61.
 “Liszt und die Suche nach dem TrisZtan-Akkord,” Acta Musicologica 72/2 (2000): 169-188.
 “The Quest for the Origins of Music circa 1900,” Journal of the American Musicological Society 53/2 (2000): 345-385.
 “Trial Scenes at Nuremberg” Music Analysis 20/2 (2001): 239-267.
 “Liszt’s Musical Monuments,” Nineteenth Century Music 26/1 (2002): 52-72.
 “Eco-Musicology,” Journal of the Royal Musical Association 127/2 (2002): 332-47.
 “Apologia for Erik,” Opera Quarterly Special Issue: Wagner's Flying Dutchman 21/3 (2005): 416-429.
 “Wax Cylinder Revolutions,” Musical Quarterly 88/1 (2005): 123-160.
 “Rousseau, Rameau and Enharmonic Furies in the French Enlightenment,” Journal of Music Theory 49/1 (2005): 141-180.
 “On the Record,” Cambridge Opera Journal 18/1 (2006): 59-82.
 “Moses’s Beginning,” Opera Quarterly Special Issue: Image and Idea in Schoenberg’s Moses und Aron 23/3 (2007): 395-417. 
 with John McKay, “Music Theory and Platonic Dialogues: A Response to Jay Kennedy,” Apeiron (2011): 359-375.
 “Tonality as Rule and Repertoire; Or, Riemann’s Functions—Beethoven’s Function,” Music Theory Spectrum 29/2 (2011): 109-123.
 "Ecomusicology between Apocalypse and Nostalgia: Some Critical Challenges,” Journal of the American Musicological Society Colloquy: Ecomusicology 64/2 (2011): 409-414.
 with Bevil Conway, "Neuroaesthetics: The Trouble with Beauty” Public Library of Science Biology 11/3 (March 19, 2013). 
 “Music-Historical Egyptomania 1650-1950,” Journal of the History of Ideas 75/4 (2014): 545-580.
 “Three Music-Theory Lessons,” Journal of the Royal Musical Association 141/2 (2016): 251-282.
  “Instruments of Music Theory,” Music Theory Online 22/4 (December 2016).
 “Discrete/Continuous: Media Theory after Kittler,” Journal of the American Musicological Society 73/1 (2017): 221-228.
 “Opening the Music Box,” Journal of the Royal Musical Association 144/1 (2019): 205–221.

Book Chapters
 “August Halm’s Two Cultures As Nature,” Music Theory and Natural Order, eds. Clark and Rehding. Cambridge: Cambridge University Press, 2001, 142-160.
 “Inventing Liszt’s life: early biography and autobiography,” Cambridge Companion to Liszt, ed. Kenneth Hamilton. Cambridge: Cambridge University Press, 2005, 14-27.
 “Wagner, Liszt, Berlioz, and the ‘New German School’,” National Spirit or European Ideal: Nineteenth Century Perceptions of the German Role in Europe, ed. Mary Anne Perkins and Martin Liebscher (Stuyvesant, NY: Edwin Mellen Press, 2006), 159-187.
 “Magic boxes and Volksempfänger: Radio music in the Weimar Republic,” Music, Theatre, and Politics in Germany 1850-1950, ed. Nikolaus Bacht. Aldershot: Ashgate, 2006, 255-272.
 “Europäische Musiktheorie und chinesische Musik 1800/1900,” in Musiktheorie im kulturellen Kontext: Proceedings of the 5th Meeting of the German Society for Music Theory, eds. Hanns-Werner Heister, Wolfgang Hochstein, Jan Philipp Sprick. Berlin: Weidler, 2008, 303-323.
 “LA-bécarre à l’allemande ou LA-dièse à la française ? Notes en bas de page sur Beethoven, Riemann et d’Indy,” in Pratiquer l’analyse musicale : une discipline musicologique et son histoire, eds. Nicolas Donin and Rémy Campos. Geneva: Conservatoire de Genève, 2009, 301-321.
 “Dualistic Forms,” in The Oxford Handbook of Riemannian and Neo-Riemannian Studies, ed. Gollin and Rehding. New York: Oxford University Press, 2012, 218-245.
 “Carl Dahlhaus zwischen Tonalität und tonality,” Carl Dahlhaus und die Musikwissenschaft, ed. by Hermann Danuser. Schliengen: Edition Argus, 2012, 321-334. 
 “Après une Lecture de Tannhaüser: Reflections on Liszt and Cultural Transfer,” in Liszt et la France, eds. Nicolas Dufetel, Dana Gooley, Malou Haine, and Jonathan Kregor. Paris: Vrin, 2012, 79-91. 
 “Urklänge: The Search for the Origins of German Music (1910-1950),” in Germania Remembered, eds. Nicola McLelland and Christina Lee Manchester: Manchester University Press, 2013, 231-250.
 with Andrea F. Bohlman, “Doing the European Two-Step,” in Empire of Song: Europe and Nation in the Eurovision Song Contest, ed. Dafni Tragaki. Metuchen, NJ: Scarecrow Press, 2013, 281-298. 
 “Heldentaten der Musik: Die Eroica und die Prometheus-Musik,” in Beethoven-Handbuch, eds. Albrecht Riethmüller and Rainer Cadenbach. Laaber: Laaber Verlag, 2013, 1: 71-94. 
 “Of Sirens Old and New” in The Oxford Handbook of Mobile Music and Sound Studies, eds. Sumanth Gupinath and Jason Stanyek. New York: Oxford University Press, 2014, 1: 77-107.
 “The Discovery of Slowness in Music,” in Thresholds of Listening, ed. Sander van Maas. New York: Fordham University Press, 2015, 206-225.
 “Consonance and Dissonance,” in The Oxford Handbook of Critical Concepts in Music Theory, eds. Rehding and Rings. New York: Oxford University Press, 2019.	
 “Unsound Seeds,” in Nineteenth-Century Opera and the Scientific Imagination, eds. David Trippett and Benjamin Walton. Cambridge: Cambridge University Press, 2019.
 “Timbre/Techne,” in The Oxford Handbook of Timbre, eds. Dolan and Rehding. New York: Oxford University Press, 2020.

References

External links
 Rehding biography at Harvard University
 Guggenheim Foundation Biography
 Past Fellows at Princeton Society of Fellows 
 15 Minutes with the Dent Medallist (Interview with Alexander Rehding)
 What the Controversial Changes at Harvard Mean for Music in the University (Interview with Harvard Faculty Members)
 Sounding China Online catalog of Exhibition, organized with a group of Harvard graduate students in 2012
 Hearing Modernity Archive of 2013 Sawyer Seminar
 Instruments of Music Theory Pre-AMS Conference 2017

Living people
Radcliffe fellows
Year of birth missing (living people)
Alumni of Queens' College, Cambridge